Hay bucking, or "bucking hay", is a type of manual labor where rectangular hay bales, ranging in weight from about , are stacked by hand in a field, in a storage area such as a barn, or stacked on a vehicle for transportation, such as a flatbed trailer or semi truck for delivery to where the hay is needed. The act of throwing the bales up to a higher level is called "bucking".  The work is very strenuous and physically demanding, and is dependent upon using a proper technique in order to not become fatigued and avoid injury.  

Large quantities of small square bales are sometimes gathered with mechanical equipment such as a hay stacker, which can hold up to about 100 hay bales.

The workers generally wear chaps to protect their legs and use hay hooks, long metal hooks with wooden handles, to secure the bales and move them.  An apparatus known as an elevator is used to move the bales, conveyor belt style, to levels too high to buck them.  Workers are usually paid by the ton or by the number of bales. Because the work is so labor-intensive, many farmers have taken to making multiple ton bales that are moved with machines.

Hay bucking competitions are sometimes held at rodeos and county fairs.

References

Harvest
Agricultural terminology
Rodeo-affiliated events